REFORM Alliance, also known as REFORM or Reform, is a non-profit organization dedicated to probation, parole, and sentencing reform in the United States through legislation and lobbying.

History

Founding
REFORM Alliance was founded in January 2019 by Michael Rubin, Meek Mill,  Jay-Z, Michael Novogratz, Clara Wu Tsai, and Daniel Loeb. At its founding, the philanthropists pledged a combined $50 million to the organization and to create a bipartisan response to what it considered unjust sentencing laws in the United States. The organization was formed in reaction to Meek Mill's November 2017 sentencing, when he was sentenced to two to four years in prison for doing wheelies on a dirt bike, which violated the terms of his parole  Rubin and Robert Kraft visited Meek Mill in jail, and Jay-Z and Rubin helped to support Meek Mill's legal battle. Jay-Z, who served as an executive producer for Time: The Kalief Browder Story, also took Michael Novogratz to visit a New York City jail after Novogratz watched the film and had a desire to learn more. The five men later collaborated with others to form REFORM Alliance. REFORM Alliance initially launched at an event at John Jay College. Van Jones was hired to lead REFORM as the Chief Executive Officer. At its founding, REFORM established a goal to reduce the number of people impacted by probation and parole laws by one million over the course of five years.

2019–2021 
Jessica Jackson serves as the organization's Chief Advocacy Officer. In September 2020, California passed Assembly Bill 1950, which marked the first passage of REFORM-sponsored legislation. In 2021, Robert Rooks replaced Van Jones as CEO, and Van Jones took a position on the organization's Board of Directors.

Work
REFORM Alliance focuses on passing legislation to reform the probation and parole laws in the United States. The organization works alongside other criminal justice groups such as Cut50 and the American Conservative Union. REFORM has helped to pass legislation in California, Michigan, Louisiana, and Virginia. REFORM has worked with numerous celebrities and executives, including Kim Kardashian, Madonna, and Jack Dorsey.

During the COVID-19 pandemic, REFORM helped distribute 12.5 million masks and personal protective equipment to prisons across the United States for incarcerated persons as well as correctional officers. In May 2020, Jack Dorsey donated $10 million to REFORM to help provide personal protective equipment to incarcerated persons.

In September 2020, the first REFORM Alliance-supported legislation passed when California Governor Gavin Newsom signed Assembly Bill 1950 into law.

California
In California, REFORM Alliance works closely with the American Conservative Union, Californians for Safety and Justice, Cut50, and Dream Corps. REFORM helped to pass AB 1950, AB 3234, and SB 118. AB 1950 was REFORM Alliance's first major "legislative victory", which REFORM worked on alongside Assemblywoman Sydney Kamlager-Dove. AB 1950 is designed to lower recidivism rates by shortening probation terms across California, and reduced probationary periods from three years to one for misdemeanors and five years to two for most felonies. The legislation is expected to decrease California's probation population by thirty-three percent and is considered one of the most transformative probation reform laws in the country.

Michigan
Michigan had the sixth-highest rate of probation supervision, leading REFORM to support legislation in the state. REFORM worked to pass SB 1048, SB 1050, and SB 1051, bipartisan probation reform laws, through the Michigan State Legislature which passed on January 4, 2021. The laws reduced adult felony probation sentences in Michigan from five years to three years and prevented endless extensions on misdemeanor and felony probation terms. Additionally, the laws limit jail sanctions for technical probation violations and require parole supervision terms to be tailored to a person's individualized risks and needs. The laws are expected to lower Michigan's caseload by 8.4 percent.

Louisiana
In Louisiana, REFORM helped to pass HB 77 and HB 643. REFORM advocated for HB 77 to create a remote reporting system for people on probation, since people on probation often have to leave work in order to meet with their probation officers.

Virginia
In 2021, alongside Justice Forward VA, the American Conservative Union, and Faith and Freedom, REFORM worked to pass HB 2038. The law creates a system of graduated sanctions for technical probation violations, which prevents people from being re-incarcerated for a first-time technical probation violation. If there are additional technical violations, the court must first find that there is no other safe and a less-restrictive way to deter the conduct before imposing a term of incarceration.

See also
 Kalief Browder

References

Legal advocacy organizations in the United States
Political advocacy groups in the United States
Criminal justice reform in the United States
Criminal defense organizations
Organizations established in 2019